Phon Ngam is a small river town in Sainyabuli Province, Laos. It is located along the main road (Route 4, south of Ban Na Le and north of Muang Saiapoun.

References

Populated places in Sainyabuli Province